The 2019–20 Beşiktaş J.K. season was the club's 116th year since its foundation, 98th season of competitive football and the club's 61st season contesting the Süper Lig, the top division of Turkish football. The season consisted of the period between 1 July 2019 and 25 July 2020.

Season events
On 1 June 2019, Şenol Güneş became manager of the Turkey national team, with Abdullah Avcı taking over in his place.

On 19 March, the Turkish Football Federation suspended all football due to the COVID-19 pandemic.

On 4 May, Loris Karius announced that he had terminated his loan deal with Beşiktaş.

On 13 May, the Turkish Football Federation announced that the Süper Lig would resume on 12 June.

Squad

Transfers

In

Loans in

Out

Loans out

Released

Friendlies

Competitions

Süper Lig

League table

Results summary

Results by matchday

Results

Turkish Cup

UEFA Europa League

Group stage

Squad Statistics

Appearances and goals

|-
|colspan="14"|Players out on loan:

|-
|colspan="14"|Players who left Beşiktaş during the season:

|}

Goal scorers

Clean sheets

Disciplinary Record

References

Beşiktaş J.K. seasons
Turkish football clubs 2019–20 season